Joseph Somers is an American artist and painter most famous for his canvases, three-dimensional in both their structure and illusion.

His work was featured at International Art Show Las Vegas. The artwork at this show moved and created another dimension of art.  Collectors enjoyed the 3 pieces on display, Beach Chairs, Pebble Beach & Playing Cards.

Early life 
Somers lost both his parents at a young age and was raised with other homeless children on a farm in New York state. He joined the Army at the age of 16, and after returning to civilian life he spent the next 15 years with a religious vocation, and then worked in the medical field.

Life as an artist
Somers was interested in illusionist art and had been influenced by Escher and Dali. He opened his first studio in 1989. He drew on his extensive travels and varied career in his representational work. His canvases use a special technique to create the illusion of three dimensions. His furniture is often whimsical with painted surfaces, anthropomorphic legs, and plant-like growths.

Technique
His canvases are made of a series of vertical wedges, usually three per work, painted in a realistic style on each side of the wedge. The images are arranged so that, when seen from one point, the images on the various wedges form a realistic whole with slight breaks in the visual field. As the viewer moves in front of the canvas, the images on the various wedges seem to move and swim.

Photographs of his canvases give a sense of how they are constructed, but they give no real sense of the illusion of movement. The three wedges have six surfaces. The most common method of composition is to have two separate images painted onto the canvas, one for the left-facing surfaces and another for the right-facing surfaces. Often one image shows a landscape. The other image is often a door, window or other opening. When viewed from a single point, it seems that there are three parallel openings looking onto a single scene. The images are painted not on a two-dimensional surface but instead on three-dimensional wedges, as one moves, the lines of perspective of this 3-D surface change in a way different from that of a 2-D surface, creating a pleasantly disorienting effect of a shifting, swimming surface.

References

 Central Square Gallery

External links 
 http://www.carollawrencegalleries.com/
 Walker Art with images of his canvases

Year of birth missing (living people)
Living people
American artists
Bard College faculty